The 1992–93 Macedonian Second Football League was the first and inaugural season since its establishment after the Republic of Macedonia's independence from Yugoslavia. It began in August 1992 and ended on 20 June 1993.

Participating teams

League standing

See also
1992–93 Macedonian Football Cup
1992–93 Macedonian First Football League

References

External links
Football Federation of Macedonia 
MAK.pdf
MacedonianFootball.com 

Macedonia 2
2
Macedonian Second Football League seasons